Oncideres poecila is a species of beetle in the family Cerambycidae. It was described by Henry Walter Bates in 1880. It is known from Honduras, Mexico and Salvador.

References

poecila
Beetles described in 1880